Morten Ask (born May 14, 1980) is a Norwegian professional ice hockey player who last played for Vålerenga Ishockey of the Norwegian GET-ligaen.

Playing career
Beginning his career in Norway for Vålerenga Ishockey of the GET-ligaen, Ask moved to North America and had spells in the CHL with the Laredo Bucks in the 2002–2003 season and the ECHL with the Toledo Storm and the Las Vegas Wranglers. In 2005 he moved to Finland's SM-liiga and spent a season with SaiPa. In 2006 he moved to Sweden and signed with Djurgården where he played until 2007 before moving to Füchse Duisburg in Germany's Deutsche Eishockey Liga during the 2007–08 season. After the insolvence of Duisburg, Ask signed a contract with Nürnberg Ice Tigers on July 7, 2009. He then signed try-out contracts with first HC Sparta Praha of the Czech Extraliga, and then with Lørenskog IK of the GET-ligaen, but he wasn't offered an extension with any of the two teams. After failing twice to take a regular spot in a team for the 2011–12 season, Ask signed a two-month contract with HV71 of the Swedish Elitserien on November 2, 2011.

On January 7, 2014, he was named to Team Norway's official 2014 Winter Olympics roster. Later in 2014 Ask was featured on the Norwegian TV2's documentary "Iskrigerne", for his play in Vålerenga.

Career statistics

Regular season and playoffs

International

References

External links
 

1980 births
Living people
Djurgårdens IF Hockey players
Füchse Duisburg players
Furuset Ishockey players
Expatriate ice hockey players in the United States
HV71 players
Laredo Bucks players
Las Vegas Wranglers players
Lørenskog IK players
Norwegian expatriate ice hockey people
Norwegian ice hockey centres
Nürnberg Ice Tigers players
SaiPa players
Toledo Storm players
Vålerenga Ishockey players
Olympic ice hockey players of Norway
Ice hockey players at the 2014 Winter Olympics
Ice hockey people from Oslo
Norwegian expatriate sportspeople in Sweden
Norwegian expatriate sportspeople in the United States
Norwegian expatriate sportspeople in Germany
Norwegian expatriate sportspeople in Finland
Expatriate ice hockey players in Finland
Expatriate ice hockey players in Germany
Expatriate ice hockey players in Sweden